Jessica Wolfe is an American singer, songwriter, bass synth player and actress from Los Angeles, California. She is a founding member along with Holly Laessig of the indie pop musical group Lucius. She was married to Lucius drummer, Dan Molad, but they divorced ahead of the Second Nature album tour.

Biography
Jessica Wolfe was born in the United States. She studied at the Berklee College of Music, graduating with the class of 2007 along with Holly Laessig, and then moved to Brooklyn in 2007. She toured with Roger Waters as a backup singer on his Us + Them Tour.

Discography
with band Lucius
 Songs From The Bromley House (2009)
 Wildewoman (2013)
 Good Grief (2016)
 Nudes (2018)
 Second Nature (2022)

References

External links

Year of birth missing (living people)
Living people
American women singer-songwriters
Berklee College of Music alumni
People from Los Angeles
21st-century American women
Singer-songwriters from California